Probable G-protein coupled receptor 141 is a protein that in humans is encoded by the GPR141 gene.

GPR141 is a member of the rhodopsin family of G protein-coupled receptors (GPRs).

References 

G protein-coupled receptors